The Mason-Dixon Collegiate Hockey Association (MDCHA) is an ACHA Division III club ice hockey league that comprises smaller colleges and universities in the Mid-Atlantic region USA. Division III club hockey offers smaller colleges and universities the opportunity to field competitive hockey teams without the financial burden of higher divisions or NCAA levels.

History 
Loyola University Maryland, 2006-07 season's champion, left the conference for the 2007-08 season, while Alvernia University and Bucknell University joined the league. 
Catholic University, 2008-09 season's champion, leaves the conference to join Blue Ridge Hockey Conference, while runner-up Alvernia University also moves from MDCHA to the Delaware Valley Collegiate Hockey Conference.
University of Maryland, College Park club ice hockey joined MDCHA for the 2009-2010 season. The team left the conference for the 2011-12 season.
Wesley College in Delaware and Susquehanna University are added to the MDCHA for the 2010-11 season.  Montgomery College suspends their team and DeSales University is added as a probationary member, playing a limited league schedule.
Penn State Harrisburg is added for the 2011-2012 season.

Current teams
American University
DeSales University probationary
Dickinson College
Gettysburg College
Johns Hopkins University
Montgomery College suspended
Mount St. Mary's University
Susquehanna University
Wesley College
Penn State Harrisburg

Championship games

References

External links
MDCHA site

See also
American Collegiate Hockey Association
List of ice hockey leagues

ACHA Division 3 conferences